Constellations Podcast is a podcast series that focuses on the space and satellite industries published by Kratos Defense & Security Solutions. In each episode, the moderator speaks with business executives, entrepreneurs, innovators, and thinkers within the space and satellite industries. Guests include a mix of C-suite executives, military/government personnel, industry analysts, and a growing number of angel investors. Some guests featured on Constellations Podcast include Vint Cerf, U.S. Representative Doug Lamborn, John Gedmark, and Rick Tumlinson.

Description 
Constellations Podcast began in 2018 and releases new episodes on a bi-weekly schedule. As of June 2021, the podcast has over 100 episodes and listeners in 150 different countries. Constellations Podcast episodes average anywhere between fifteen and thirty minutes in length. The podcast is moderated by John Gilroy, a broadcasting professional with experience working at the Washington Post, Federal News Network, and WAMU 88.5 FM.

Topics have included changes in the ground segment, 5G, earth observation, virtualization, smallsats, and more. Space debris, entrepreneurship, and different orbital satellites were among the most popular topics, according to Owltail, as they appeared in the top 20 most listened to Constellations Podcast episodes.

Previous guests 
Past guests include:

 Vint Cerf, Chief Internet Evangelist at Google and one of the “Fathers of the Internet", was a guest on Constellations Podcast on its 56th episode. The episode, titled "Interplanetary Internet, “Cloudlets” and the “Inner Cloud”", discusses interplanetary internet and the impact cloud computing has on data.
 Brigadier General Brook J. Leonard, current Chief of Staff at U.S. Space Command, was a guest on Constellations Podcast and appeared on its 93rd episode. The episode, titled “U.S. Space Command, Innovation, and Defending Space Assets”, talks about the restart up of the U.S. Space Command since its relaunch in 2019 and its growing responsibilities.
 Chris Blackerby, Group COO at Astroscale appeared on its 53rd episode, titled “Space Debris, Mega Constellations and the Orbital Highway". Chris Blackerby talks about the mission Astroscale is taking regarding space debris and regulation/policies in place that would help them with their mission.

References 

Science podcasts
American podcasts
2018 podcast debuts